François-Xavier Bellamy (born 11 October 1985) is a French author, high-school teacher and politician. He was a deputy mayor of Versailles and is now Member of the European Parliament and Vice President of The Republicans.

Early life
François-Xavier Bellamy was born on 11 October 1985.

Bellamy was educated at the École Sainte-Marie des Bourdonnais, a private school in Versailles. After two-years preparatory classes in the Lycée Henri-IV, he got into the École normale supérieure, from which he graduated in 2005. He earned the agrégation in philosophy in 2008.

Career
Bellamy taught philosophy at the Lycée Sainte-Geneviève and the Lycée Notre-Dame de Grandchamp in Versailles in 2008. In 2009, he taught at the Lycée Auguste Renoir in Asnières-sur-Seine, the Lycée Louis Bascan in Rambouillet and the Lycée hôtelier in Guyancourt. Since 2011, he has been teaching philosophy and art history for the preparatory classes at the Lycée Blomet in Paris.

Bellamy is the author of four books. He won the Prix d'Aumale from the Académie française in 2014 for his first book, Les déshérités ou l'urgence de transmettre. In this essay, he analyses the failure of French educational system as the result of an ideology that refuses the transmission of culture, thus creating disinherited. Jean-Jacques Rousseau, René Descartes and Pierre Bourdieu would be the utmost representatives of this ideology.

He has been deputy mayor in Versailles for employment, youth and higher education. He was a candidate for the National Assembly elections in Yvelines's 1st constituency in 2017, invested by The Republicans, but he lost in the second round against the candidate of En Marche!, Didier Baichère with 48.9% vs 51.1% of the votes.

Since May 2019, he is Member of the European Parliament for the EPP. He is member of the Committee on Fisheries (PECH) and the Committee on Industry, Research and Energy (ITRE).

Works

References

1985 births
Living people
People from Versailles
Politicians from Paris
Lycée Henri-IV alumni
École Normale Supérieure alumni
Alumni of the University of Cambridge
21st-century French philosophers
French schoolteachers
The Republicans (France) politicians
MEPs for France 2019–2024
Candidates for the 2017 French legislative election